John Brian Freeman Rigby (7 April 1906 – 19 June 1975) was a New Zealand rower. At the 1938 British Empire Games he won the silver medal as part of the men's coxed four. He was a member of the Petone Rowing Club, and his team members in the 1938 boat were Jim Clayton (stroke), Albert Hope, Ken Boswell, and George Burns (cox).

Rigby died on 19 June 1975, and his ashes were buried at Karori Cemetery, Wellington.

References

1906 births
1975 deaths
New Zealand male rowers
Rowers at the 1938 British Empire Games
Commonwealth Games silver medallists for New Zealand
Commonwealth Games medallists in rowing
Medallists at the 1938 British Empire Games